Ali Hazazi (born 18 February 1994) is a Saudi Arabian professional footballer who currently plays as a midfielder for Al-Ettifaq.

Honours

References

External links
 

Living people
1994 births
Association football midfielders
Saudi Arabian footballers
Saudi Arabia youth international footballers
Saudi Arabia international footballers
Al-Qadsiah FC players
Place of birth missing (living people)
Saudi First Division League players
Saudi Professional League players
Ettifaq FC players